In mathematics, an algebraic representation of a group G on a k-algebra A is a linear representation  such that, for each g in G,   is an algebra automorphism. Equipped with such a representation, the algebra A is then called a G-algebra.

For example, if V is a linear representation of a group G, then the representation put on the tensor algebra  is an algebraic representation of G.

If A is a commutative G-algebra, then  is an affine G-scheme.

See also
 Algebraic character

References 
Claudio Procesi (2007) Lie Groups: an approach through invariants and representation, Springer, .

Lie groups
Representation theory